Roy Gavin Morgan (17 November 1911 – 29 December 1991) was an Australian rules footballer who played with Essendon in the Victorian Football League (VFL).

Notes

External links 
		

1911 births
1991 deaths
Australian rules footballers from Victoria (Australia)
Essendon Football Club players